Entelecara is a genus of  dwarf spiders that was first described by Eugène Louis Simon in 1884.

Species
 it contains twenty-one species:
Entelecara acuminata (Wider, 1834) (type) – USA, Europe, Russia (Europe to South Siberia), Central Asia
Entelecara aestiva Simon, 1918 – France, Italy
Entelecara aurea Gao & Zhu, 1993 – China
Entelecara cacuminum Denis, 1954 – France
Entelecara congenera (O. Pickard-Cambridge, 1879) – Europe, Russia (Europe to South Siberia)
Entelecara dabudongensis Paik, 1983 – Russia (Far East), China, Korea, Japan
Entelecara errata O. Pickard-Cambridge, 1913 – Europe
Entelecara erythropus (Westring, 1851) – Europe, Russia (Europe to Far East), Kazakhstan, Japan
Entelecara flavipes (Blackwall, 1834) – Europe
Entelecara forsslundi Tullgren, 1955 – Sweden, Estonia, Ukraine, Russia (Europe)
Entelecara helfridae Tullgren, 1955 – Sweden
Entelecara italica Thaler, 1984 – Italy
Entelecara klefbecki Tullgren, 1955 – Sweden
Entelecara media Kulczyński, 1887 – North America, Europe, Russia (Europe to Far East), Kazakhstan
Entelecara obscura Miller, 1971 – Czech Rep., Slovakia
Entelecara omissa O. Pickard-Cambridge, 1903 – Europe
Entelecara schmitzi Kulczyński, 1905 – Madeira, France
Entelecara sombra (Chamberlin & Ivie, 1947) – Canada, USA
Entelecara tanikawai Tazoe, 1993 – Japan
Entelecara truncatifrons (O. Pickard-Cambridge, 1875) – France, Corsica, Algeria
Entelecara turbinata Simon, 1918 – France

See also
 List of Linyphiidae species (A–H)

References

Araneomorphae genera
Cosmopolitan spiders
Linyphiidae